The 2018–19 Campeonato Nacional de Futebol Feminino (also known as Liga BPI for sponsorship reasons) was the 34th edition of Campeonato Nacional de Futebol Feminino. SC Braga won the title for the first time.

Teams 

Twelve teams will compete in the league – nine teams from the 2017–18 Campeonato Nacional, as well as three teams promoted from the Campeonato de Promoção.

The team changes were the following:
 Cadima and Quintajense were the teams relegated, finishing 11th and 12th, respectively.
 Marítimo, the winner of Campeonato de Promoção and Ovarense, the runner-up, were the teams promoted.
 After finishing 8th, União Ferreirense ended women's football because of problems in the direction and was replaced by Atlético Ouriense, the 3rd placed team of Campeonato de Promoção along with Braga B, which is a reserve team and can't be promoted.

Stadia and locations

Season Summary

League table

Results

Notes

References

External links
 official website (fpf)

2018-19
Por
women's
Camp|